Interstate 40 (I-40) is a part of the Interstate Highway System that travels  from Barstow, California, to Wilmington, North Carolina. I-40 is the longest Interstate Highway in North Carolina and is the only Interstate to completely span the state from west to east.

Traveling from west to east, I-40 connects the three major regions of North Carolina—Western North Carolina, the Piedmont, and Eastern North Carolina. In the Piedmont region, I-40 connects the Piedmont Triad and Research Triangle metropolitan regions. Included in these regions are the cities of Raleigh, Greensboro, Durham, and Winston-Salem which represent the second through fifth largest cities in the state, respectively. In addition, I-40 connects the cities of Asheville and Hickory in Western North Carolina, Wilmington in Eastern North Carolina, and many smaller communities along its route. The landscapes traversed by I-40 include the Blue Ridge Mountains, the foothills of western North Carolina, suburban communities, and the urban core of several Piedmont cities, along with eastern North Carolina farmland. There are five auxiliary Interstates in the state related to I-40: I-140, I-240, I-440, I-540, and I-840. I-40 formerly had one business loop which primarily ran through Winston-Salem and briefly was extended through Greensboro.

The freeway bears several names in addition to the I-40 designation. Throughout the state, the freeway is known as the Blue Star Memorial Highway, a name shared with multiple Interstates across the state. From Orange County to Raleigh, I-40 is known as the Harriet Morehead Berry Freeway, the John Motley Morehead III Freeway, and the Tom Bradshaw Freeway. I-40 is the James Harrington Freeway from U.S. Route 70 (US 70) to Interstate 95 (I-95). In Duplin County, a section of I-40 is known as the Henry L. Stevens Jr. Highway. From the Pender–New Hanover county line to the eastern terminus of I-40, the freeway is known as the Michael Jordan Highway.

I-40 was an original Interstate Highway planned in the Federal Aid Highway Act of 1956. In North Carolina, the original highway was to run from the Tennessee state line to Greensboro where the freeway would end at I-85. In 1958, the first section of completed Interstate Highway in the state was I-40 along the East–West Expressway in Winston-Salem. I-40 received two extension approvals; the first in 1969 to I-95, to be routed in or near Smithfield, and the second in 1984 to Wilmington. After 34 years since it first opened, the last section completed was the Winston-Salem Bypass in 1992.

Route description
I-40 travels through several diverse regions in North Carolina, including the Great Smoky and Black mountains of Western North Carolina, the rural Foothills, the urban Piedmont, and the farmlands of Eastern North Carolina. All of I-40 is listed in the National Highway System, a network of roads important to the country's economy, defense, and mobility. I-40 is also designated as a Blue Star Memorial Highway throughout the state.

Western North Carolina 
I-40 enters North Carolina along the north banks of the Pigeon River at the foot of Snowbird Mountain. Winding in parallel with the river, I-40 goes through twin tunnels. When the tunnels opened in 1968, they were the first Interstate tunnels east of the Mississippi River. I-40 then proceeds through the Pigeon River Gorge for the next . Just south of exit 7, I-40 uses another tunnel, for eastbound traffic only, through Hurricane Mountain. The westbound lanes use a rock cut through Hurricane Mountain. A short distance after the tunnel is the North Carolina Welcome Center. Immediately afterward is Waterville Lake, where there are a few at-grade intersections in this location, used as service access for Walters Dam and the Harmon Den Wildlife Management Area. I-40 continues toward Asheville. I-40 then merges with US 74 (Great Smoky Mountains Expressway). I-40 and US 74 encounter the I-26/I-240 interchange, sometimes called Malfunction Junction, in the southwestern part of the city. The interchange is the current western terminus of I-240 and the historic terminus of I-26. I-40 then goes along the southside of Asheville, north of the Biltmore Estate toward Hickory. I-240 and I-40 have another interchange before I-40 leaves the Asheville area.

Shortly after it leaves the Asheville area, I-40 encounters a steep grade, Old Fort Mountain, with winding roads that pose a hazard to truck traffic. There are several runaway truck ramps on this part of the highway. I-40 goes south of Black Mountain and Marion, and north of Conover. There it crosses the Eastern Continental Divide and the southern tip of the Black Mountain range. When I-40 enters Hickory, it has a clover interchange with US 321. I-40 then heads south of Hickory and crosses the Catawba River. I-40 enters Statesville north of the city. It has major interchanges with US 64 and US 21 before utilizing a clover interchange with I-77.

Piedmont region 
I-40 heads northeast toward Winston-Salem passing Mocksville and Clemmons. When I-40 enters Winston-Salem, it has another major interchange, this time with Salem Parkway which carries US 421. This interchange gives access to downtown Winston-Salem.  Continuing through the Winston-Salem city limits, I-40 passes Hanes Mall and the commercial developments in the city. After passing the area, it has a cloverleaf interchange with I-285/US 52/NC 8. I-74 exits off to the south while I-40 heads back northeast to meet up with US 421. US 421 runs a concurrency with I-40 into Greensboro.

I-40 heads into the Greensboro limits at the I-73/US 421/I-840 interchange. This interchange is the east end of the US 421 concurrency with I-40 and is also the planned western terminus of I-840. From there, I-40 heads through southwestern Greensboro. I-40 passes Wendover Place and Four Seasons Town Centre before having another large interchange with US 220. US 29/US 70 all merge into I-40/US 220 for one large concurrency  after the interchange with US 220. The road is generally a six-lane freeway throughout.

This  corridor with concurrent routes ends in the east at the US 29/US 70/US 220/Martin Luther King Jr. Boulevard junction. Both the beginning and ending interchanges of this corridor are quite unusual in design and are often operating at above full capacity, leading to frequent traffic jams and traffic incidents.

I-40 through Greensboro officially bears the name Preddy Boulevard. The nickname "Death Valley" has been given to the area of I-40 where I-40 and Interstate 85 Business (I-85 Bus.) splits. The locals have given that area that name because of the high number of deaths due to car crashes in that area. One major problem with the highway is that the US 29/US 70/US 220 southbound lanes merge from the right and exit to the left. Thus, through traffic on I-40 west and US 29 south (a major route from Virginia to Charlotte) must all merge to the other side of the freeway. A study conducted by state traffic engineers from May 1, 2006, to April 30, 2008, (the period between the I-85 relocation and I-40's relocation) concluded that "the Death Valley area" had an accident rate "higher than average for urban interstates ... but the [route] was safe anyway." There were no fatalities during the study period, but a large number of rear-end collisions.

I-40 merges with I-85 east of Greensboro. I-40 and I-85 have a  concurrency through Guilford, Alamance, and Orange counties. The concurrency section uses I-85 exit numbers instead of I-40 exit numbers. The section goes south of Elon, Burlington, Graham, and Mebane. I-40 breaks ways from I-85 at exit 163, south of Hillsborough.

After I-40 breaks away from I-85, it heads in a very southeasterly direction toward Chapel Hill. I-40 parallels NC 86 until NC 86 crosses I-40 at exit 266. I-40 is routed along northern Chapel Hill and then through southern Durham. I-40 enters the Research Triangle Park after an interchange with I-885 and NC 885. The Interstate varies in width, from four to eight lanes depending on the location. It serves as a major route between Raleigh, Cary, and Durham (the other being US 70). After leaving the Research Triangle area, I-40 has an interchange with I-540 near the Raleigh–Durham International Airport. Several I-40 exits serve Raleigh–Durham, including Aviation Parkway, Airport Boulevard, and I-540. I-40 continues to head southeast toward Downtown Raleigh. I-40 is routed north of Cary and south of Umstead State Park. At Wade Avenue, I-40 bears right to head south. It then has an interchange with I-440/US 1/US 64 at exits 293A and 293B. I-40 then runs a concurrency with US 64 along the southside of Raleigh. The concurrency ends at an interchange with I-87/I-440/US 64 at exit 301, where I-40 bears to the south.

Eastern North Carolina 
Beyond exit 301, I-40 follows a primarily south and southeasterly routing to Wilmington. It departs Raleigh to the south and runs along through eastern Garner between Jones Sausage Road (exit 303) and White Oak Road. I-40 meets US 70 and US 70 Business in Garner at exit 306. Additionally, I-40 begins to parallel NC 50 starting near exit 306 in Garner and continuing through Kenansville. I-40 and US 70 travel along a  concurrency to exit 309 where US 70 diverges to the east toward Selma and New Bern. South of exit 309, I-40 leaves Wake County and enters into Johnston County. As the highway leaves suburban regions surrounding Raleigh, it interchanges with NC 42 (exit 312), NC 210 (exit 319), and NC 242 (exit 325) which provide access to Clayton, Angier, and Benson. I-40 travels to the east of Benson, crossing over US 301 but provides no access to the highway. Immediately south of US 301, I-40 meets I-95 at exit 328, a modified cloverleaf interchange.

I-40 continues southeast through rural Johnston County, meeting NC 96 (exit 334) north of Peacocks Crossroads. Approaching Newton Grove, I-40 leaves Johnston County and enters into Sampson County. I-40 travels along the southwestern side of Newton Grove, interchanging with NC 50 and NC 55 at exit 341 and US 701 at exit 343. US 13 crosses over I-40 in the vicinity of Newton Grove but there is not a dedicated interchange. I-40 continues southeast of Newton Grove through rural Sampson County. It meets US 117 Connector and NC 403 at exit 355 southwest of Faison, and I-40 begins to parallel US 117 near the exit. It continues through Duplin County for approximately  before meeting NC 24 and NC 24 Business (exit 364) west of Warsaw. At the interchange, NC 24 begins an  concurrency with I-40 to the southeast. An interchange with US 117 (exit 369) is located south of Warsaw and I-40 begins to travel around Magnolia to the east. NC 24 departs the freeway at NC 903 (exit 373) which provides access to Kenansville. After the interchange, I-40 primarily turns to the south, bypassing Teachey, Rose Hill, and Wallace to the east. Interchanges with Charity Road (exit 380), NC 11 (exit 384), and NC 41 (exit 385) provide access to these towns and to US 117. I-40 begins to run parallel to the Northeast Cape Fear River and enters Pender County after crossing Rockfish Creek near Wallace.

The highway once again meets US 117, at an interchange south of Wallace and crosses to the western side of US 117. I-40 remains on the western side of US 117 for  until it crosses over I-40 north of Burgaw. The highway bypasses Burgaw to the east, meeting NC 53 (exit 398) east of the town. Continuing south, I-40 once again meets NC 210 at exit 408 near Rocky Point and then crosses the Northeast Cape Fear River into New Hanover County where it picks up the name "Michael Jordan Freeway". I-40 passes to the east of Castle Hayne and interchanges with Holly Shelter Road at exit 412. From I-140 and NC 140, I-40 continues south passing east of Olsen Park before turning to the southwest and meeting US 117 and NC 132 at exit 420. Eastbound I-40 runs concurrently with US 117 and NC 132 for  beyond the exit, while westbound I-40 is concurrent with US 117 and NC 132 for approximately  due to the design of the interchange. The eastern terminus of I-40 is located at US 117 and NC 132 north of Kings Grant Road in Wilmington. The highway continues south as North College Road toward US 74, the University of North Carolina Wilmington, and Carolina Beach.

Dedicated and memorial names
The freeway bears several names in addition to the I-40 designation. Throughout the state, the freeway is known as the Blue Star Memorial Highway, a name shared with multiple Interstates across the state. The freeway is known as the Harriet Morehead Berry Freeway through Orange County, named for a leader in the good roads movement in North Carolina. Between US 15/US 501 in Chapel Hill to I-885/NC 885 in Durham, I-40 is known as the John Motley Morehead III Freeway who was a noted philanthropist and graduate from the University of North Carolina Chapel Hill. I-40 is the Dan K. Moore Freeway from Research Triangle Park to the Tom Bradshaw Freeway. The section is named after Dan K. Moore who was the 66th Governor of North Carolina. From the Wade Avenue Extension to US 70 in Garner, the freeway is known as the Tom Bradshaw Freeway, named after the 33rd Mayor of Raleigh. I-40 is the James Harrington Freeway from US 70 to I-95. In Johnston, south of I-95, and Sampson counties, I-40 is dedicated to Robert D. Warren Sr. who was a former State Director of Driver's Licenses and State Senator from the area. From the Pender–New Hanover county line to the eastern terminus of I-40, the freeway is known as the Michael Jordan Highway, named after the famous basketball player who grew up in Wilmington and was a graduate of the University of North Carolina-Chapel Hill. I-40 has also been given the name Tobacco Road by college sports fans, because the freeway links up the four North Carolina schools in the ACC.

History
Authorized by the Federal Aid Highway Act of 1956, North Carolina was originally allocated  for their share of the Interstate Highway System;  of which was subsequently allocated for a route from the Tennessee state line, through Asheville and Winston-Salem, to Greensboro. Designated as I-40, it became the first Interstate in the state after opening on a completed  section in Winston-Salem in 1958. For the next 32 years, I-40 was constructed and extended twice to its current routing from the Pigeon River Gorge to Wilmington.

Beginnings 
The first major overland transportation corridors in North Carolina were the Indian trading paths. One of these, the Rutherford's Trace, followed the path of modern I-40. In 1921, the North Carolina Highway System was established, with NC 10, nicknamed the "Central Highway", designated on the route between Asheville and Greensboro. By the time US 70 was established in 1926 and placed on concurrency on all of NC 10, nearly all of the route was either paved or oil-treated. After World War II, the federal government began planning on a new Interregional Highway system, as mandated by the Federal-Aid Highway Act of 1944, and released a proposed National System of Interstate Highways in 1947, which included a route that followed loosely to US 70 from the Tennessee state line to Greensboro. After years of planning and the passing of the Federal Aid Highway Act of 1956, which established the route between Tennessee and Greensboro, American Association of State Highway and Transportation Officials (AASHTO) approved the I-40 designation in 1957.

Interstate Highway era 
In 1958, the first construction job in the country that was designated specifically for I-40 was in Haywood County, along the Pigeon River. That same year, the first two sections of I-40 opened: the first was the  East–West Expressway in Winston-Salem; the second was from US 421 in Kernersville to US 29/US 70 in Greensboro. In both cases, these first freeways were constructed a couple of years prior for US 158 and US 421, respectively, and did not benefit from the 1956 Act; as a result, in 1988, the state was able to convince the Federal Highway Administration (FHWA) to build the Winston-Salem Bypass. Between Ridgecrest and Old Fort, US 70 along Youngs Ridge was four-lane as of 1954; however, I-40 was not officially designated until 1982, after additional highway improvements, including additional widening, runaway truck ramps, and warning devices.

In 1960, I-40 made three expansions: in Burke County, from Dysartsville Road (SR 1129) to Hildebran (connecting to US 64/US 70 along I-40 Access Road Southeast (SR 1890)); from NC 16 in Conover to NC 90 in Statesville; and from NC 801 near Advance to the US 158/US 421 split east of Winston-Salem. In 1961, I-40 extended west from Dysartsville Road to NC 226 near Marion. In Statesville, I-40 extended east along a completed widening project of the US 64 Bypass, between NC 90 to US 64. In 1962, I-40 extended west from NC 226 near Marion to link-up with US 70 near Old Fort. In 1963, the gap between Winston-Salem and Kernersville was completed. In 1964, I-40 opened a  segment from east of Clyde (using the freeway connector from US 19/US 23) to Wiggins Road (SR 1200). In 1967, I-40 opened a  segment through the Biltmore Estate from NC 191 to US 25. In 1968 and after 10 years of construction, I-40 opened a  segment from the Tennessee state line to US 276 in Cove Creek. In November of same year, the North Carolina State Highway Commission submitted a request to the Bureau of Public Roads to extend I-40 east of Greensboro to Raleigh via the Research Triangle Park (RTP). In 1969, both the Bureau and AASHTO approved the extension, allowing I-40 to continue east of Durham through Raleigh to Smithfield. Also in the same year, I-40 was extended west from NC 191 to connect with I-26 and end at US 19/US 23 in Enka. In 1970, I-40 extended west from NC 801 near Advance to US 64 near Mocksville.

In 1971, two gaps were completed: Wiggins Road (SR 1200) to US 19/US 23 in Enka; and US 64 in Statesville to US 64 near Mocksville. In July, NCSHC finalized a plan for I-40's routing east of Durham to Smithfield, with an estimated cost of $75 million (equivalent to $ in ). In December, new freeway opened between Davis Drive (SR 1999) in the Research Triangle Park (RTP) to US 1/US 64 (Raleigh Beltline) in Raleigh; I-40 was added along  between Davis Drive and Harrison Avenue (SR 1654), while east of Harrison Avenue (future Wade Avenue) was signed "To I-40". In 1972, I-40 extended east from US 25 in Asheville to Porters Cove Road (SR 2838) in Oteen; the extension bypassed both US 25A and US 74, where interchanges were built in 1999 and 1973, respectively. In 1973, I-40 and the Durham Freeway (future NC 147; now I-885) were connected in the RTP. In 1974, a gap was completed between US 276 in Cove Creek to the freeway connector (future Great Smoky Mountains Expressway) near Clyde. I-40 also extended east from Porters Cove Road in Oteen to Patton Cove Road (SR 2740) in Swannanoa. In 1976, a gap of I-40 was completed between Henry River Road (SR 1002) in Hildebran and NC 16 in Conover. In April 1978, after years of debate on where I-40 should be routed east of I-95, either Morehead City or Wilmington, the North Carolina Department of Transportation (NCDOT) approved a corridor location between Raleigh and Wilmington. The discussions on its routing started since the initial extension in 1969 and arguments from several area groups why the routing should go to their port city. In the end, the routing approval to Wilmington came with a caveat to build new freeway in parallel to US 117 instead of a full upgrade of US 421 as several in the region supported. In 1979, I-40 was extended east from Patton Cove Road in Swannanoa to US 70 in Ridgecrest.

In 1982, I-40 was designated, in concurrency with US 70, along Youngs Ridge between Ridgecrest and Old Fort; this officially completed the original I-40 routing from Tennessee to Greensboro. In 1984, I-40 was extended in Raleigh from Wade Avenue (exit 289), along the Tom Bradshaw Freeway, to the Cliff Benson Beltline (exit 301). Also same year, AASHTO approved of designation of I-40 between Wallace and Wilmington, currently under construction at the time. By 1985, construction began on a  project, connecting the Durham Freeway in the RTP with I-85 west of Hillsborough at an estimated cost of $103 million (equivalent to $ in ). In 1985, I-40 was placed on new  section between US 117 (exit 390) near Willard and NC 210 (exit 408) near Rocky Point. In 1986, I-40 was extended west from the Durham Freeway (exit 279) to NC 55 (exit 278) in the RTP; I-40 was also extended east to its current eastern terminus at US 117/NC 132 (exit 420) in Wilmington. In 1987, I-40 was extended west from US 117 (exit 390) near Willard to NC 41 (exit 385) near Tin City. In 1988, I-40 was extended west to US 15/US 501 (exit 270) in Chapel Hill and east to US 70 (exit 306) in Garner. In October, then-Governor James G. Martin announced federal approval of $114.1 million (equivalent to $ in ) for I-40 to be relocated around Winston-Salem. In 1989, I-40 was extended west to I-85 (exit 259) west of Hillsborough and east to I-95 (exit 328) in Benson. By 1990, I-40 was extended west from NC 41 (exit 385) in Tin City to US 117 (exit 369) near Warsaw. On June 29, 1990, with a ribbon-cutting by Gov. James G. Martin, I-40 was connected between Raleigh and Wilmington, providing improved access with the Port of Wilmington with the rest of the state. In December, AASHTO approved the I-40 designation between Raleigh and Wallace; and in January 1991, NCDOT certified the designation.

The final gap of I-40 was completed when it was designated along existing I-85 from Greensboro to west of Hillsborough c. 1992. In November, the  Winston-Salem Bypass was completed and opened; featuring mostly new construction, with a short overlap of existing US 311 freeway. The former alignment, featuring the first sections of I-40 completed in the state, was designated as I-40 Bus., with a complete concurrency with US 421. After 34 years, I-40 was officially completed in North Carolina.

Since completion 
In 1996,  of I-40/I-85, through Alamance and Orange counties, were widened to eight lanes. At a cost of $175 million (equivalent to $ in ), the project began in 1989 and opened completed sections in phases.

In December 2004, a  widening project was completed from US 15/US 501 (exit 270) in Durham to NC 147 (now I-885/NC 885; exit 279) in the RTP. The project expanded lanes from four to six-lanes. In March 2005, construction crews returned for eight weeks to replace asphalt used in the widening project, which began to deteriorate not long after the lanes opened to the public. However, the paving mistakes were more severe, and NCDOT contracted Lane Construction Corp to replace all the bad concrete used in the botch widening project, at a cost of $21.7 million (equivalent to $ in ).

In 2011, an  widening project was completed between Harrison Avenue (exit 287) and Gorman Street (exit 295). At a cost of $49 million (equivalent to $ in ), the project expanded lanes from four to six-lanes.

Pigeon River Gorge 

The first section of I-40 in North Carolina is the section that travels through the Pigeon River Gorge in Haywood County. Known locally as simply "The Gorge", this part of I-40 cuts a path from the Tennessee state line to Waynesville. This section of the Interstate is curvy and tends to become a bit narrow in some places when compared to other portions of the highway. Because much of the road was cut through mountainside and along the river, concrete retaining walls have been built on both sides of the road and in the median, cutting down on the width of the breakdown lanes. Coupled with speeding vehicles, the thick fog that tends to plague the area, winter weather, and little room to maneuver in case of accident, this area has become notorious for its severe and many times fatal accidents. It is reported that a person is 20 times as likely to die on I-40 in Haywood County than they would be to win the Powerball lottery, which equals to be twice the average of any other Interstate Highway in North Carolina.

Even some minor accidents have been known to tie up traffic in this area, because there is little room to move accidents off or to the side of the road with the terrain. Speeding semitrucks have been a problem in the gorge and have subsequently led to many accidents. In 2002 and 2003, two state troopers were killed in two separate accidents by speeding trucks that drifted off the road and hit their police car conducting a traffic stop. This led the North Carolina Highway Patrol to crack down on speeding tractor trailers and speeders in general through the area.

This portion of the highway is also notorious for rockslides and rocks falling onto the highway. The main cause is an engineering flaw, in that sections of the highway have been built on the northside of the Pigeon River, where the rock stratums foliate toward the highway.

In 1985, a severe rockslide buried the westbound entrance to one of two tunnels that carry the highway through the gorge. Repair of the slide area and the tunnel required shifting westbound traffic to the eastbound tunnel, while eastbound traffic was diverted onto a temporary viaduct around the tunnels. In July 1997, a rockslide near the Tennessee state line closed the entire road for nearly three months.

In 2009, a large rockslide at milemarker 2.6 along I-40 near the Tennessee State Line shut down the freeway for several weeks. While the slide only caused minor injuries, it shut down I-40 in both directions.

Greensboro relocation 

In February 2008, I-40 was relocated onto the southern section Greensboro Urban Loop, marking the first change to I-40 since it was rerouted onto the Winston-Salem Bypass opened in 1992 which was completely constructed the same year. At a cost of $122 million (equivalent to $ in ), it was constructed by Archer Western Contractors of Atlanta and took four years to complete. NCDOT Secretary Lyndo Tippett said that "the opening of the Greensboro Western Urban Loop is a major step in improving the mobility of the Triad region" and that "the highway will provide better access for motorists in and around Greensboro, as well as those traveling between the eastern and western areas of our state." The new routing was placed in concurrency with I-73, while its former alignment became an extension of I-40 Bus.

The glowing sentiment the NCDOT Secretary gave on the new I-40 routing was unfortunately not reciprocated. NCDOT received many complaints by local residents and motorists on the confusion between "Blue" 40 and "Green" 40. Greensboro residents also had concerns with the resulting increased traffic and noise. On September 12, 2008, seven months after the initial switch and in agreement with Greensboro DOT and FHWA, I-40 was rerouted to its original route through the city, I-40 Bus. was decommissioned, and I-73 and I-85 were left as the only Interstates signed along the loop. Exit numbers on the western segment of the loop were to be replaced with I-73 exit numbers; while exit numbers along I-40 Bus. would be changed over to I-40 exit numbers. At a cost around $300,000 (equivalent to $ in ), all signage was replaced by July 1, 2009. In November 2009, US 421 was rerouted onto the Urban Loop, replacing most of I-40's brief alignment around Greensboro.

The current alignment of I-40 is  shorter than the 2008 Urban Loop routing and is the quicker route for any vehicle consistently traveling at the posted speed limits.

Statesville interchange rebuild 
In Statesville, the I-40/I-77 interchange (exit 152), originally built in the late 1960s, is currently being upgraded to increase capacity and improve safety. The initial estimated cost for the entire project is $251 million with construction started in March 2012. The first phase, completed in summer 2019, involved the widening of I-40 from four to six lanes.  The second phase, begun in 2020, involves a similar widening of I-77 and the reconstruction of the interchange into a partial turbine interchange. There is no anticipated completion date for the project as of September 2020.

Fortify project 

Begun in 2013, an extensive project known as "Fortify" (a play on the route number "40") overhauled I-40 along the southern edge of Raleigh, from the I-40/US 1/US 64 interchange (exit 293) near Cary Crossroads through the I-40/I-440 split (exit 301) in Southeast Raleigh, including the easternmost  of I-440 as well. The project necessitated a complete teardown and rebuild of the roadway, widening of the roadway, rehabilitation and widening of bridges and overpasses along the entire route, and extension and widening of several highly congested exit and entrance ramps.

The project was divided into two phases, the first (completed in summer 2015) was a rebuilding and repaving of I-40 and I-440 from I-40 exit 301 to I-440 exit 14. The second phase, completed in late 2018, was the more extensive rebuild of I-40 from exit 293 to exit 301.

Southeast Raleigh–Clayton widening 

Begun in autumn 2018 after the completion of the Fortify project to widen I-40 through South Raleigh, the section of I-40 between the I-40/I-440 split (exit 301) and NC 42 (exit 312) is being widened. As part of the widening project, many of the overpasses along the route are being reconstructed, both to accommodate the wider road underneath, and to expand capacity of the roads passing overhead. An onramp was removed at exit 306 (US 70) in November 2019 in order to accommodate the wider roadway. Traffic that normally used a free-flowing loop ramp is now routed through a left-turn traffic light to access the other onramp. Exit 312 (NC 42) is being rebuilt entirely as a diverging diamond interchange, and an additional ramp is being built at that exit to provide access to Cleveland Road. Additionally, the interchange at exit 309 for US 70 (Clayton Bypass) is being expanded to also including the future NC 540/Triangle Expressway. In December 2020, a new overhead flyover ramp between I-440 east and I-40 east was opened, replacing the older ramp to allow for the wider freeway underneath.  The project is expected to be completed to Exit 309 by 2023, with the I-40/NC 42 interchange rebuild expected to be completed by 2024.

Future
A widening project along I-40 is in development stage, between milemarkers 259 and 279 in Orange and Durham counties. After some initial delays due to noise concerns through populated areas and two public comment meetings, the project is currently in the right-of-way acquisition phase, and construction is scheduled to begin around 2022; however, NCDOT has suspended engineering activities for the project.

Exit list

Related routes
There are five auxiliary routes and three former business routes for I-40 in the state.

I-140 is a spur route in Wilmington that bypasses  US 17 and forms a partial loop in the city. I-240 loops around downtown Asheville and the districts in the city. I-440 serves as much of the inner loop in the Raleigh, while I-540 serves as an outer loop in the Raleigh area, also bypassing the suburbs. I-840 serves as part of the north portion of the Greensboro Urban Loop. 

I-40 Bus. used a freeway grade going through downtown Winston-Salem and the districts surrounding downtown, while I-40 used a mostly newer bypass stretch going through fewer districts in the city limits. In 2020, Interstate 40 Bus. was decommissioned. Salem Parkway was picked as the new name for the route. There was an I-40 Bus. in Raleigh which was unsigned and was replaced by I-440. In 2008, I-40 Bus. was briefly designated going through Greensboro when I-40 was rerouted onto the southern part of the Greensboro Urban Loop, which was then recently completed. I-40 was eventually rerouted back in going through most of the city that same year.

References

External links

NCRoads.com: I-40

40
 North Carolina
Research Triangle
Transportation in Haywood County, North Carolina
Transportation in Buncombe County, North Carolina
Transportation in McDowell County, North Carolina
Transportation in Burke County, North Carolina
Transportation in Catawba County, North Carolina
Transportation in Iredell County, North Carolina
Transportation in Davie County, North Carolina
Transportation in Forsyth County, North Carolina
Transportation in Guilford County, North Carolina
Transportation in Alamance County, North Carolina
Transportation in Orange County, North Carolina
Transportation in Durham County, North Carolina
Transportation in Wake County, North Carolina
Transportation in Johnston County, North Carolina
Transportation in Sampson County, North Carolina
Transportation in Duplin County, North Carolina
Transportation in Pender County, North Carolina
Transportation in New Hanover County, North Carolina